1972 ballet premieres, List of
Lists of ballet premieres by year
Lists of 1970s ballet premieres
Ball